The International School Twente (ISTwente ) is an English-teaching international school located in Enschede, Overijssel in the Netherlands. It is composed of a primary division and a secondary division. Both divisions teach all classes in English(except for some language classes). The primary division has classes from grade 1-6 while the secondary division offers grade 7 -13. Both divisions work in close cooperation but are yet to be fully integrated.

History
The primary division of ISTwente opened its doors on August 25, 2008. The secondary division opened officially on January 13, 2012 by the Right Honourable Mrs Ank Bijleveld, the Queen's Commissioner for the province of Overijssel. After several years of development, it grew to a school with over 100 students from more than 40 nationalities.

Facilities
The secondary division of ISTwente locates inside the Zuid campus of Het Stedelijk Lyceum. It has its own department within the campus while sharing the fully equipped gyms, sports field, science labs, and art & music department. A canteen is in service for ISTwente and a carpark belonging to the Zuid campus is located in front of the school.

The primary division of ISTwente is located separately in its own independent building in Johannes ter Horststraat 30, 7513 ZH Enschede.

Curricula 
The secondary department of ISTwente currently offers a full Cambridge Secondary curriculum to students from 11/12-18/19, including Cambridge Secondary 1 (with Checkpoint), Cambridge IGCSE, Cambridge International AS and A-Level, and Cambridge Pre-U.  A gradual transition from CIE A-Levels to the IB Diploma Programme is in progress. At this moment subjects offered include:

English, English Literature, English Language, Dutch, German, French, Spanish, Spanish Literature, Chinese(only exams), Mathematics, Further Mathematics(only exams), Biology, Chemistry, Physics, Science, History, Geography, Economics, Business, Global Perspectives, Humanities, Visual Arts, ICT, Computer Science, and P.E.

ISTwente is known to offer a flexible programme in which students who are more capable are allowed to take more classes than expected and are not restricted to age limits for exams and graduation. Students are allowed to take an exam even when it is not offered as a part of the curriculum if the student shows the capability to pass it.

In 2015, ISTwente saw its first graduates, who received university offers from the Netherlands, UK, Canada, and the U.S. from many top-50 schools in the world such as University College London and McGill University, leaving the school.

ISTwente's primary curriculum is based on the National Curriculum for England (NCE), and International Primary Curriculum (IPC). In July 2016, the school received its IPC accreditation, making it the third fully accredited IPC school in The Netherlands.

Student organizations 
Students in the secondary division of ISTwente initiated many student organizations. ISTwente secondary is the base of International Student Council Twente and International Honor Society Twente, the first of which fosters student involvement in school management and school-related activities & projects, and the latter one has the goal to develop the academic potentials of all students in ISTwente and beyond. After school clubs such as the ISTwente Music Club is in operation as well.

References

Schools in Overijssel
International schools in the Netherlands
Secondary schools in the Netherlands
Buildings and structures in Enschede